The blue field entoptic phenomenon is an entoptic phenomenon characterized by the appearance of tiny bright dots (nicknamed blue-sky sprites) moving quickly along squiggly lines in the visual field, especially when looking into bright blue light such as the sky. The dots are short-lived, visible for a second or less, and traveling short distances along seemingly random, curvy paths. Some of them follow the same path as predecessors. The dots may be elongated along the path like tiny worms. The speed of the dots varies in sync with the pulse; they briefly accelerate at each heartbeat. The dots appear in the central field of view, within 15 degrees from the fixation point. The left and right eye see different dots; someone looking with both eyes sees a mixture. 

Most people are able to see this phenomenon in the sky, although it is rather weak, and many people do not notice it until asked to pay attention. The dots are highly conspicuous against a monochromatic blue background (~430 nm) instead of the sky. The phenomenon is also known as Scheerer's phenomenon after the German ophthalmologist Richard Scheerer, who first drew clinical attention to it in 1924.

Explanation

The dots are white blood cells moving in the capillaries in front of the retina of the eye.
Blue light (optimal wavelength: 430 nm) is absorbed by the red blood cells that fill the capillaries. The eye and brain "edit out" the shadow lines of the capillaries, partially by dark adaptation of the photoreceptors lying beneath the capillaries. The white blood cells, which are larger than red blood cells, but much rarer and do not absorb blue light, create gaps in the blood column, and these gaps appear as bright dots. The gaps are elongated because a spherical white blood cell is too wide for the capillary. Red blood cells pile up behind the white blood cell, showing up like a dark tail. This behavior of the blood cells in the capillaries of the retina has been directly observed in human subjects by adaptive optics scanning laser ophthalmoscopy, a real time imaging technique for examining retinal blood flow.
The dots will not appear at the very center of the visual field, because there are no blood vessels in the foveal avascular zone.

Blue field entoptoscopy
In a technique known as blue field entoptoscopy, the effect is used to estimate the blood flow in the retinal capillaries. The patient is alternatingly shown blue light and a computer generated picture of moving dots; by adjusting the speed and density of these dots, the patient tries to match the computer generated picture to the perceived entoptic dots.

Difference from other entoptic phenomena
Scheerer's phenomenon can be easily distinguished from floaters (muscae volitantes). 
Scheerer's phenomenon consists of corpuscles of identical diameter and visual sharpness, of a simple dot or worm-like shape, brighter than the background. If the eye stops moving, the dots keep darting around. If the eye moves, the dots follow instantaneously, because they are contained in the retina. In contrast, floaters are specks or threads of variable diameter and variable visual sharpness, some of complex shape, darker than the background. If the eye stops moving, the floaters settle down. If the eye moves, the floaters follow sluggishly, because they are contained in the vitreous humor, which is subject to inertia.

Scheerer's phenomenon can be distinguished from visual snow because it appears only when looking into bright light, whereas visual snow is constantly present in all light conditions including the dark.

See also 
 Entoptic phenomenon
 Floater

References

External links
Video describing history and science of blue field entoptic phenomenon and viewing techniques

Optical phenomena
Ophthalmology
Vision